

See also
Missouri statistical areas
List of metropolitan statistical areas
Combined Statistical Areas

External links
http://www.census.gov/

 
Missouri